Sparks is a town in Cook County, Georgia, United States. The population was 2,052 at the 2010 census.

History
A post office called Sparks was established in 1888. The community was named after W.B. Sparks, the president of the Georgia Southern and Florida Railway.

The Georgia General Assembly incorporated Sparks as a town in 1888.

Geography

It is bordered on the south by the city of Adel, the county seat. U.S. Route 41 passes through the center of the town as Goodman Street. Interstate 75 runs through the west side of the town, with access from Exit 41.

Demographics

2020 census

As of the 2020 United States census, there were 2,043 people, 778 households, and 572 families residing in the town.

2000 census
As of the census of 2000, there were 1,755 people, 644 households, and 443 families residing in the town. The racial makeup of the town was 53.16% White, 43.65% African American, 0.40% Native American, 0.40% Asian, 1.60% from other races, and 0.80% from two or more races. Hispanic or Latino of any race were 3.42% of the population.

There were 644 households, out of which 37.3% had children under the age of 18 living with them, 43.6% were married couples living together, 20.7% had a female householder with no husband present, and 31.2% were non-families. 27.6% of all households were made up of individuals, and 10.6% had someone living alone who was 65 years of age or older.  The average household size was 2.69 and the average family size was 3.25.

In the town, the population was spread out, with 30.8% under the age of 18, 8.9% from 18 to 24, 29.9% from 25 to 44, 18.5% from 45 to 64, and 11.9% who were 65 years of age or older.  The median age was 32 years. For every 100 females, there were 86.5 males.  For every 100 females age 18 and over, there were 80.9 males.

The median income for a household in the town was $26,806, and the median income for a family was $29,861. Males had a median income of $22,583 versus $16,087 for females. The per capita income for the town was $10,779.  About 19.6% of families and 26.7% of the population were below the poverty line, including 35.9% of those under age 18 and 28.9% of those age 65 or over.

References

Towns in Cook County, Georgia
Towns in Georgia (U.S. state)